Alandur is a legislative assembly in Chennai district and partially includes areas from Chengalpattu district and Kanchipuram District in the Indian state of Tamil Nadu. Its State Assembly Constituency number is 28. It consists of portions that includes the Alandur, Nanganallur, Adambakkam, Palavanthangal, Moulivakkam, Nandambakkam, Iyyapanthangal, Manapakkam, Mugalivakkam, Cowl Bazaar, St Thomas Mount cum Pallavaram Cantonment Board, Gerugambakkam, Kolapakkam, and some other parts of Chennai City and forms a part of Sriperumbudur constituency for elections to the Parliament of India. It is one of the 234 State Legislative Assembly Constituencies in Tamil Nadu, in India.

Members of the Legislative Assembly

Election results

2021

2016

2014 Bye-election

2011

2006

2001

1996

1991

1989

1984

1980

1977

References 

 

Assembly constituencies of Tamil Nadu
Kanchipuram district